Anne Ursu is an American novelist and children's writer based in Minneapolis, Minnesota.

Biography
She attended Brown University.

Ursu's first novel, Spilling Clarence, is about a drug that wafts through the air of a small Minnesota town. The drug had a strong effect on the town's residents, who then suffered from visceral memories and stupor. Her second novel, The Disapparation of James, is about a boy disappearing during a stage magic trick.

Breadcrumbs, a middle-grade novel published by Walden Pond Press, was released September 27, 2011. Inspired by Hans Christian Andersen's "The Snow Queen," Breadcrumbs is a story of the struggle to hold on, and of the things we leave behind.

Ursu has also written a trilogy for middle-grade readers, the Cronus Chronicles, (published by Atheneum), involving two cousins' adventures in the realms of Greek mythology. The individual titles are The Shadow Thieves, The Siren Song, and  The Immortal Fire.

She published another middle-grade fantasy in 2013, The Real Boy, which was longlisted for the National Book Award.

She teaches at Hamline University's low residency MFA in Writing for Children and Young Adults.

Ursu is also the former author of a popular sports blog about the Minnesota Twins called bat-girl.com. In 2007, she posted on the site that she no longer had time to maintain it, saying: "The time has come to end this wonderful adventure. I had hoped to be able to keep it up with Dash, but I simply do not have time to do this blog well, and there is no point in doing it any other way."

Awards and honors
 2013, McKnight Fellowship in Children's Literature
 2013, The Real Boy, long listed for the National Book Award

Bibliography
 Spilling Clarence, Hyperion, 2003—Winner of the 2003 New Voice (first-time author) award from the Minnesota Book Awards.
The Disapparation of James, Hyperion, 2004. As recommended by Nancy Pearl in More Book Lust.
 Breadcrumbs, HarperCollins, 2011.
 The Real Boy,  Walden Pond Press, 2013
 The Lost Girl,  Walden Pond Press, 2019
 The Troubled Girls of Dragomir Academy, Walden Pond Press, 2021

The Cronus Chronicles
 The Shadow Thieves, Atheneum, 2006. 
 The Siren Song, Atheneum, 2007. 
 The Immortal Fire, Atheneum, 2009.

Articles and Short Stories
 "The President's New Clothes," Politically Inspired, MacAdam/Cage,  2003
 Articles in the Washington Post Book World, the StarTribune, on Salon.com, and ESPN.com

References

External links
 
 
 

American women novelists
American sportswriters
American bloggers
American women sportswriters
American people of Romanian descent
American women bloggers
21st-century American women writers
21st-century American novelists
Living people
Year of birth missing (living people)
American women non-fiction writers
21st-century American non-fiction writers